Theodoros "Thodoris" Kalakonas (born 28 October 1974) is a Greek water polo player who competed in the 1996 Summer Olympics (6th place), and in the 2004 Summer Olympics (4th place) with the Greece men's national water polo team. He was part of the national squad that won the silver medal at the 1997 World Cup in Athens and the Bronze Medal in the 2004 World League in Long Beach.

At club level, Kalakonas played most notably for Piraeus giants Ethnikos (1990–2001, 2006–2008) and powerhouse Olympiacos (2001–2004), with whom he won 1 LEN Champions League, 1 LEN Super Cup, 3 Greek Championships and 3 Greek Cups. Kalakonas was a key player in Olympiacos' 2002 Quardruple (LEN Champions League, LEN Super Cup, Greek Championship, Greek Cup all in 2002), being the top scorer of Olympiacos with 3 goals in the 2002 LEN Champions League final win (9–7) against Honvéd in Budapest.

He is the 10th all time scorer in Greek league history.

Honours

Club
Ethnikos

Greek Championship (1): 1994
 Greek Cup (1): 2000

Olympiacos
 LEN Euroleague (1): 2001–02
 LEN Super Cup (1): 2002
 Greek Championship (3): 2002, 2003, 2004
 Greek Cup (3): 2002, 2003, 2004

National team
  Silver Medal in 1997 World Cup, Athens
  Bronze Medal in 2004 World League, Long Beach
 4th place in 2004 Olympic Games, Athens
 6th place in 1996 Olympic Games, Atlanta
 4th place in 2003 World Championship, Barcelona

References

1974 births
Living people
Greek male water polo players
Olympiacos Water Polo Club players
Olympic water polo players of Greece
Water polo players at the 1996 Summer Olympics
Water polo players at the 2004 Summer Olympics
Ethnikos Piraeus Water Polo Club players
Water polo players from Athens